Eudonia torodes is a moth in the family Crambidae. It was described by Edward Meyrick in 1901. It is endemic to New Zealand.

References

Moths described in 1901
Eudonia
Moths of New Zealand
Endemic fauna of New Zealand
Taxa named by Edward Meyrick
Endemic moths of New Zealand